Frederik Nielsen and Tim Pütz were the defending champions but chose not to defend their title.

Harri Heliövaara and Emil Ruusuvuori won the title after defeating Lukáš Klein and Alex Molčan 6–4, 6–3 in the final.

Seeds

Draw

References

External links
 Main draw

Slovak Open - Doubles
2020 Doubles